Orival Pessini (6 August 1944 – 14 October 2016) was a Brazilian actor, comedian, and writer known for his characters Sócrates, Charles, Fofão, Patropi, Juvenal, Ranulpho Pereira, Hitler (based on the Austrian Nazi dictator Adolf Hitler), Clô (based on the stylist Clodovil Hernandes), Frank (in honor of the singer Frank Sinatra) and others on programs and TV commercials, and also for using latex masks (made by himself) in the composition of his characters.

Career 
Pessini began his career in amateur theatre and later began appearing in famous commercials such as "Jarrão da Ki-Suco" products, "Campanha da AACD" and "Tiger by Kellogg's". His TV debut was on the Children's "Quem Conta Um Conto" on Tupi TV in 1963. During this period, Orival began to develop his own technique, creating latex masks with movement, to be able to play different characters on stage, in the same way that Chico Anysio played different characters on TV. In the 1970s, he played the monkeys Socrates and Charles, from the Planeta dos Homens (Globo). In 1988, the character Patropi debuted on the show Praça Brasil on the Bandeirantes Network, being invited to act in other shows such as Escolinha do Professor Raimundo  (Globo) and A Praça é Nossa (SBT). Parallel to his work on TV, Orival presented a solo show called Patropi e Cia.

It was on the program Balão Mágico (Globo) that Orival created the dolls Fofão and Fofinho, and the first one, whose gardener was made by Ney Galvão, was interpreted by Orival . Fofão was so successful that, with the end of the global program, he won his daily program TV Fofão (Bandeirantes), in which he presented humorous pictures and cartoons. He also starred in a movie for the cinema (Fofão e a Nave sem Rumo) in 1989, had several licensed products under his name, and released 10  discs.

In 2014, Orival starred unmasked in the global series Amores Roubados as Father José, opposite Patrícia Pillar. In that same year, his character Fofão paraded in the carnival being honored by the school Rosas de Ouro that brought the theme "Unforgettable" recalling figures that marked the lives of many people.

He died on 14 October 2016, aged 72, after being admitted to Hospital São Luiz, in São Paulo, to undergo treatment against a cancer in the spleen.

After Pessini's death, the masks (and their molds) of his characters were destroyed. It was a wish of the actor, who feared that someone would misuse the material.

Filmography

Balão Mágico as Fofão
Escolinha do Professor Raimundo as Patropi
Amores Roubados

References

External links

1944 births
2016 deaths
Deaths from cancer in Rio de Janeiro (state)
Brazilian people of Italian descent
20th-century Brazilian male actors
21st-century Brazilian male actors
Brazilian male film actors
Brazilian male television actors
Brazilian puppeteers
Male actors from Rio de Janeiro (city)